Ploërdut is a commune in the Morbihan department in Brittany in north-western France.

Population

Geography

 north of Lorient. Historically, the village belongs to Vannetais.

History

The romanesque nave church dates from the eleventh or twelve century.

Gallery

See also 
 Kério, a hamlet of Ploërdut
 Communes of the Morbihan department

References

External links

 Mayors of Morbihan Association 

Communes of Morbihan